Jozef Balej (born February 22, 1982) is a Slovak former professional ice hockey right winger. He spent parts of three seasons in the National Hockey League, and several seasons in the Czech Extraliga.

Playing career
As a youth, Balej played in the 1995 and 1996 Quebec International Pee-Wee Hockey Tournaments with a team from Bratislava.

Balej left his native Slovakia in 1998 to develop his game in North America, and spent a season in the USHL before moving to the Portland Winter Hawks of the Western Hockey League. After a solid first season in Portland in which he recorded 22 goals, Balej was selected 78th overall in the 2000 NHL Entry Draft by the Montreal Canadiens. He would spend two more seasons in Portland, turning in a dominant performance in 2001–02 with 51 goals in 65 games.

Signed by Montreal, Balej turned pro in 2002 and spent the 2002–03 season in the AHL, where he struggled, recording just 5 goals and 20 points in 56 games. While he possessed dynamic speed and a heavy shot, the slightly-built Balej struggled with the bigger, stronger pro game and took time to adjust. However, he showed marked improvement in 2003–04, scoring 25 goals and 58 points in 55 games, and earned a four-game callup to Montreal.

At the trade deadline near the end of the 03–04 season, Balej was traded to the New York Rangers as the centerpiece of a deal for star winger Alexei Kovalev. With the Rangers out of the playoff picture, he was given an extended look in New York, appearing in 13 games and scoring his first NHL goal and adding 4 assists for 5 points. At the conclusion of the season, he was re-assigned to the Hartford Wolfpack of the AHL for the playoffs where he scored 9 goals and 16 points in 16 games. He continued to play for Hartford during the 2004–05 NHL lockout, but had a disappointing year with 20 goals and 42 points in 69 games.

At the start of the 2005–06 season, Balej was dealt to the Vancouver Canucks with a 6th round draft pick in 2008 for Fedor Fedorov. He played well for the AHL Manitoba Moose to start the season, and earned a one-game callup to the Canucks, in which he played well and recorded an assist. However, shortly after his return to Manitoba he suffered a gruesome injury when he crashed into the boards and harpooned himself in the midsection with his stick. The blow crushed his kidney and caused severe internal bleeding, and was initially feared to be career-threatening. However, he battled back to return for the end of the season and the playoffs.

Balej was given a qualifying offer by the Canucks to return for the 2006–07 season, but opted instead to sign in Switzerland for HC Fribourg-Gottéron, where he recorded 13 goals and 30 points in 37 games. Balej re-signed with the Canucks for 2007–08, but suffered through an injury-plagued year in the minors in which he appeared in only 16 games.

In 2008, Balej signed with HC Oceláři Třinec of the Czech league. Unfortunately, injuries have continued to plague his career, as he has been limited to only 52 appearances in two years with Oceláři Třinec.

Career statistics

Regular season and playoffs

International

Awards and honors

References

External links

1982 births
EHC Freiburg players
Hamilton Bulldogs (AHL) players
Hartford Wolf Pack players
HC Ambrì-Piotta players
HC Fribourg-Gottéron players
HC Kometa Brno players
HC Oceláři Třinec players
HC Plzeň players
HC Red Ice players
HC Slovan Bratislava players
KHL Medveščak Zagreb players
Living people
Manitoba Moose players
Montreal Canadiens draft picks
Montreal Canadiens players
MsHK Žilina players
New York Rangers players
People from Myjava
Sportspeople from the Trenčín Region
Piráti Chomutov players
Portland Winterhawks players
Rochester Mustangs players
ŠHK 37 Piešťany players
Slovak ice hockey right wingers
Thunder Bay Flyers players
Vancouver Canucks players
Slovak expatriate ice hockey players in Germany
Slovak expatriate sportspeople in Austria
Slovak expatriate ice hockey players in Switzerland
Slovak expatriate ice hockey players in Canada
Slovak expatriate ice hockey players in the United States
Slovak expatriate ice hockey players in the Czech Republic
Expatriate ice hockey players in Austria